Piritta Kantola (born 1978) is a Finnish ten-pin bowler. She won a bronze medal in the women's singles event at the 2001 World Games and finished in 13th position of the combined rankings at the 2006 AMF World Cup.

References

Living people
1978 births
Finnish ten-pin bowling players
Competitors at the 2001 World Games
Competitors at the 2005 World Games
World Games bronze medalists
World Games medalists in bowling
Place of birth missing (living people)